Tikitherium is an extinct genus of mammaliaforms from the Late Triassic. It is thought to be an insectivore and a close relative to Docodonta. Tikitherium refers to Tiki, the village located near the Tiki Formation where the specimen was found, and therium is Greek for “Beast”. The species was named copei in honor of Edward Drinker Cope for his pioneering discoveries towards understanding mammalian molars.

History and discovery 
Tikitherium copei was first described by Datta in 2005. The first and only specimen is an upper left molar that was discovered in the lower part of the Tiki Formation, located in the South Rewa Gondwana Basin, India. Both the genus Tikitherium and the species copei were named by Datta in 2005. The currently only known specimen was deposited in the Paleontology Division of the Geological Survey of India, Calcutta. Although only a single tooth was found, it showed several derived features that are similar to other early mammalian dentitions, but further detailed comparisons showed the various differences that allowed this tooth to specifically stand out on its own.

Geological and paleoenvironment 
The Tiki Formation is located in the South Rewa Gondwana Basin, Madhya Pradesh, India. It is known for many vertebrate fossils being found there. The area can be described as having red mudstones with greenish grey mottling, calcareous sandstones, cross-bedding feldspathic sandstones, and lime-pellet conglomerate horizon. The upper triassic Tiki Formation is a mud-dominated fluvial followed by coarse to fine grained quartzo-feldspathic sandstone. It is overlain by the Parsoria Formation and is composed of pink, red, and lavender colors and interbeds of sandstone that contain clay clasts of varying size. The Tiki Formation is underlain by the Pali Formation with local erosional contact to the area of study. The beginning of the Triassic is indicated by arid climate in most of the Gondwana Basins. In particular in the Tiki Formation the sandstone in the Valley turns clay dominant indicating the Middle Triassic.

The Tiki Formation contains well preserved and varied vertebrate assemblages including fish, amphibians, reptilian, and mammalian amniotes. The mudstone has also been home to many teeth specimen, skull fragments, and post-crania. It also hosts partial and complete skeletons of temnospondyls, phytosaurs, and rhynchosaurs.

The faunal and floral assemblages of the Tiki Formation are comparable to the Late Triassic assemblage of the German Keuper. Because of its faunal and floral assemblages, the Tiki Formation is also comparable to the lower part of the Maleri Formation of the Pranhita-Godavari Basin and the Camp Springs Member of the Dockum Group, USA, and thus was assigned the Late Triassic Age.

The tooth was discovered in a bed of calcareous mudstone exposed 4 kilometers Southwest of the Tiki Village, which has the same stratigraphic horizon from a tooth of the Late Triassic Morganucodontid mammal Gonwanadon Tapani was recovered.

Description

Dentition 
There has only been a single left molar found and all of the characters have been based on this sole specimen. It has several derived traits that resemble those of Docodonta and Holotherian molars. The tooth is supported by three large roots unlike in Woutersia, which only has two large roots. The smallest root supports the small lingual half while in Docodonta the largest root supports the small lingual half. It is tricuspid with three buccally placed cusps forming an obtuse triangle contrasting the cusp pattern in Docodonts where they are in a linear fashion. It is thought that Woutersia's upper molar teeth to be comparable to Tikitherium in regards to cusp pattern and crown dimensions. The principal buccal cusp is the tallest measured at a height of 1.08mm and the tooth has a broad base occupying the entire length of the crown. There are prominent cusps with two associated shearing crests. There is also a talon-like platform anterior to the prominent cusps. The tooth also has a strong and wide lingual and buccal cingula. There are wear facets on the molar to suggest occlusion with the lower molars. In Tikitherium, the wear facets are found on the lingual side unlike with Woutersia where the wear facets are found only on the anterior face. The wear facets can also be described to be located in the narrow valley between the lingual face of two cusps while in Docodonts the wear facts are confined to the central basins.

Skull 
It has been suggested that the angular process is a present and homologous feature across Mammaliaformes. Tikitherium could possibly have one present based on this conclusion although no conclusion can be made without the discovery of a skull specimen.

Paleobiology

Feeding 
The wear facets on the upper molar suggest a probable occlusal relationship with the lower dentition. However no conclusion can be made about occlusion without a lower dentition specimen. There is also a posterolingual cusp with two shearing crests and basins to indicate mastication via grinding. This molar is the earliest representative of several independent evolutionary developments found in later mammalian groups such as Boreosphenida, Australosphenida, Shuotheriids, and Docodonta. It is also the earliest mammal representative to possess this advanced dental specialization and is the evidence towards the hypothesis of homoplastic evolution of dental grinding features. Before the finding of the Tikitherium specimen, it was hypothesized that the origin of the crushing mastication in docodonts was from Morganucodon's, shearing nature via the shearing crests and cusps and occlusion. It was later found that Woutersia also had the crushing molar action that would be later found in Docodonta.

Classification 
Tikitherium is considered to be mammal based on Datta (2005). However, the phylogeny based on Luo and Martin (2007) places Tikitherium and Docodonta as sister taxa, which are Mammaliformes, based on the shared traits of wear facets and platform on the lingual side of the molars. Although Luo and Martin conclude that Tikitherium and Docodonta are the most closely related, it is debated that Woutersia instead may be the sister taxa to Docodonta due to the similarity of their prominent lingual cusps.

References 

Prehistoric mammaliaforms
Prehistoric cynodont genera
Carnian genera
Late Triassic synapsids
Triassic synapsids of Asia
Triassic India
Fossils of India
Fossil taxa described in 2005